The Liga Nacional de Fútbol Profesional, also known as LaLiga (the abbreviation LFP was also used until the 2015-16 season), is a sports association responsible for administering the two professional football leagues in Spain, the Primera División (aka "La Liga") and Segunda División. Founded in 1984, the organisation has independent legal status from the Spanish Football Federation (RFEF) and it is autonomous in its operations. Its main role, in addition to defending its members' interests, is to organise the National League Championship in conjunction with the RFEF.

The Liga Nacional de Fútbol Profesional rejects the European Super League for being an exclusive and exclusionary championship that does not reward sporting merit, eliminates domestic leagues as the vehicle for earning a place in Europe's elite, and bases its governance model on the power of wealthy clubs.

LaLiga is headquartered at the Murano Building, in Calle de Torrelaguna 60, Madrid. Since 2013, Javier Tebas serves as the chairman of the organisation.

Competition: National League Championship 
The 42 member clubs of LaLiga are grouped into two divisions: Primera División or LaLiga Santander (20 clubs) and Segunda División or LaLiga SmartBank (22 clubs). In any given season a club plays each of the others in the same division twice, once at their home stadium and once at that of their opponents. This makes for a total of 38 games played each season in LaLiga and 42 in Segunda División.

Clubs gain three points for a win, one for a draw, and none for a defeat. At the end of each season, the club with the most points in LaLiga Santander is crowned champion. If points are equal, the head-to-head records determine the winner. If still equal, the goal difference and then goals scored become the deciding factors. As for Segunda División, at the top end three clubs win promotion to LaLiga, with the bottom three LaLiga clubs taking their places. At the lower end, four clubs are relegated to Primera División RFEF, while four teams from Primera División RFEF join LaLiga SmartBank in their stead.

The National League Championship has only been interrupted on two occasions throughout its history, during the Spanish Civil War (1936-1939) and in 2020 due to the COVID-19 pandemic.The competitions were suspended between 9 March and 11 June 2020, when they began again without spectators.

LaLiga Teams

Organisation 
Headquartered in Madrid, the institution is also present in 55 countries through its 11 offices and 46 delegates. The majority of the association's social outreach work is carried out by its Foundation.
Featuring amongst LaLiga's main responsibilities is the organisation of the professional football competitions, the implementation of a financial control system, managing the centralised sale of the audiovisual rights and overseeing an internationalisation and technology leadership strategy.
During the COVID-19 pandemic and in light of the announcement of a state of alarm that saw citizens confined to their homes, LaLiga organised various cultural and sports events online.

General Assembly 
The General Assembly is the deliberative assembly of la "Liga Nacional de Fútbol Profesional". It is composed of the 42 football clubs and public limited sports companies (S.A.D.) that make up the Primera and Segunda División. Each club/S.A.D. is usually represented by its respective president.

President
The president, along with the other members of the Executive Committee, is responsible for the day-to-day running of the organisation. The current president is Javier Tebas, who was elected to the post in April 2013 and re-elected in October 2016 and in December 2019.

Name & Sponsorships 
In its first statutes, which were passed in 1984, the organisation was officially named as the National Professional Football League, although amongst the media and supporters the institution's name was shortened and informally referred to as La Liga or the Professional Football League, with the acronym "LFP" commonly used.

In the 1996/97 season, the media began to refer to the competition by its nickname, Liga de las estrellas ('League of the stars'). The onset of financial prosperity, conversion of clubs to SADs, sale of audiovisual rights and the Bosman ruling, which enabled greater movement of European Union footballers (and other foreigners, including South American and African players), attracted the best foreign footballers and saw the Spanish game take off once and for all. At this time, the competition was often referred to as the Professional Football League, despite this not being its official name.

This unofficial moniker, which didn't represent any issue amongst the Spanish media, did begin to prove problematic, given that it was identical to and featured the same acronym as France's Ligue de Football Professionnel (LFP).

The competition's first sponsorship agreement was signed with BBVA. From 2008, the top flight's name featured BBVA, its lead sponsor, and was known as the Liga BBVA, whilst the second rung was referred to as the Liga Adelante.  The sponsorship deal with BBVA ran up until the 2015/16 campaign.

On 21 July 2016, the association signed a three-year sponsorship deal with Santander Bank. This saw the name of the league regain independence as it came to be known as LaLiga whilst the organisation's corporate identity was revamped. The sponsorship agreement with Santander Bank resulted in new names for the institution's two main competitions. The top flight was renamed as LaLiga Santander, whilst the second tier would now be known as LaLiga 1|2|3.  The latter underwent another name change in August 2019, when it became known as LaLiga SmartBank.

In short, the association's only official names are LaLiga and the National Professional Football League.

Ball Sponsorship 
Nike was the official ball supplier of LaLiga for more than 10 seasons between the 1996/97 season and the 2018/19 season, taking over from Adidas. From 2019–20, German sportswear company Puma became the official provider of match balls.

Official match ball 
 1996–1998: Nike 850 Geo
 1998–2000: Nike 800 Geo
 2000–2002: Nike Geo Merlin
 2002–2004: Nike Geo Merlin Vapor
 2004–2006: Nike T90 Aerow I
 2006–2008: Nike T90 Aerow II
 2008–2009: Nike T90 Omni
 2009–2010: Nike T90 Ascente
 2010–2011: Nike T90 Tracer
 2011–2012: Nike Seitiro
 2012–2013: Nike Maxim
 2013–2014: Nike Incyte
 2014–2015: Nike Ordem 2
 2015–2016: Nike Ordem 3
 2016–2017: Nike Ordem 4
 2017–2018: Nike Ordem 5
 2018–2019: Nike Merlin
 2019-present: Puma

Financial management

Cleaning up finances & financial controls 
A process involving a clean-up of Spanish football's finances and the implementation of financial control measures began in 2013 in response to the critical financial plight of the majority of the clubs. In an assembly meeting held on 21 May 2014, the clubs approved the Financial Control Regulations for the National Professional Football League Member Clubs and Public Limited Sports Companies, which saw the clubs and SADs self-impose a series of stricter regulations than those enforced by UEFA and establish that LaLiga would be responsible for overseeing a financial control system and monitoring of its member clubs and SADs.

This saw the clubs and SADs embark on a process during which they settled outstanding player wages and reduced their debts with the Spanish tax authorities (AEAT) and social security. This led to improved financial solvency and established fair competition between clubs, avoiding financial doping.

Audiovisual Rights 
LaLiga's progress and consolidation is also the result of the centralised marketing of the audiovisual rights of the top-flight and second-tier clubs (LaLiga Santander and LaLiga Smart Bank) and public limited sports companies. The centralised sale of audiovisual rights, which represents the clubs' primary source of revenue, was approved during the Congress of Deputies held on 14 May 2015, with the regulations established in the Royal Decree-Law 5/2015. 

This decree law put an end to the tug-of-war between LaLiga, the RFEF and the government, which began in 1997 with the ruling that one game per week must be shown free.

Socio-economic impact 
The financial activity generated by LaLiga represents a strategic sector. According to a study published by Price Waterhouse Coopers (PwC) in 2019, the competition generated €15.7 billion in the 2016/17 season, which represented 1.37% of Spain's GDP and provided 185,000 direct and indirect job positions.

The PwC report reveals that the financial impact of the professional football industry in the 2016/17 season was double the levels recorded in the 2012/13 campaign, when its impact was valued at €7.6bn and accounted for 0.75% of Spain's GDP. Meanwhile, the industry's impact on employment opportunities experienced a 28% increase during this same period (rising from 140,000 to 184,600 job positions) and tax receipts rose by 41%, from €3bn to €4.1bn.

Football generates revenue for other businesses that use the game as a lever to generate activity. This 'tractor impact' reveals that of the €2.4bn that supporters spent on matchdays, €1.07bn was spent inside the stadium, €1.23bn in bars and €100bn on tourist activities; €561 million was spent on pay-TV channels and media consumption apiece, whist €261m was spent on betting and €217m on video games. 

Every euro of revenue earned by LaLiga generated €4.20 across the rest of the activities and each of the competition's job positions created another four roles in other sectors. In terms of the contribution to Spain's tax coffers, the professional football industry contributed €4.1bn.

Ref: LaLiga.com

According to the Economic-Financial Report for the 2019-2020 season, the first season affected by the confinement and restrictions of the COVID-19 pandemic, Spanish soccer manifested its strength and sustainability, exceeding 5 billion in revenues for the first time, despite the impact of the pandemic. LaLiga was the only major league competition to achieve a positive net result (77 million euros), and the one that generates the most revenue per capita. All of this was thanks to the responsibility shown by Spanish clubs in containing costs.

Seasonal Income 

Ref: LaLiga

In 2021 LaLiga contributed more than €125 million to other entities for the development of non-professional soccer and other sports. Of this amount, the RFEF received 52% (€65.6 million), the CSD 39.5% (€48.8 million) and the players' unions 8.9% (€11.3 million). This means an increase of 13% with respect to the 19/20 season and 202% with respect to the 14/15 season.

LaLiga - CVC agreement 
In August 2021, LaLiga agreed on the creation, together with the private equity fund CVC Capital Partners, of a holding company and a joint accounts agreement, whereby the fund contributed €2.7 billion in exchange for 10.95% of the profits generated from the commercial exploitation of the different LaLiga products, to be repaid by the clubs over 50 years. The project was called LaLiga Impulse.

LaLiga Impulse was unanimously approved by the clubs at the Delegate Commission of 4 August, 2021 and approved at the General Assembly by a majority of 39 clubs (out of 42 in total) on 12 August. At this assembly, Real Madrid CF, FC Barcelona, Athletic Bilbao and Real Oviedo voted against, although the Asturian club finally decided to sign up to the agreement days later to guarantee its sporting project.

The agreement between CVC and LaLiga foresees the possibility of any club opting out or joining at a later date, where the sums corresponding to these clubs are subtracted from the initial amount. Following the decision by the aforementioned clubs not to form part of it, the final amount was set at around €2.1 billion in exchange for a percentage of almost 10.95% of the commercial profits. As for the use made of the funds by the clubs, 70% must be destined to infrastructure, 15% to settling debt, and the remaining 15% for increasing the wage limit for players in the first three years.

Technological resources

Digitalisation 
The gradual digitalisation within our society has been mirrored in the professional ranks of the Spanish game, resulting in an enhanced audiovisual product and multimedia development. LaLiga boasts a digital ecosystem that revolves around three elements: channels, services and data, which enable clubs and supporters to interact. Through its website, mobile apps and LaLigaSportsTV, the over-the-top platform launched in early 2019, the institution has achieved the participation of those supporters who interact with all of these devices, whilst the services speed up and simplify fan access. All of the data generated as a result of this interaction is used to customise content, affording the association the opportunity to tailor content across all of the channels in the ecosystem.

Data has become an essential element of LaLiga's strategy when it comes to centralising, organising, preparing and providing all of the necessary information to make decision-making more effective and efficient. Over time, the clubs have been provided with the various tools and technological applications based on artificial intelligence, which, amongst other purposes, serve to detect cases of match-fixing and assist when making decisions about kick-off times to ensure optimum stadium attendance and viewing figures.

In 2021, LaLiga developed LaLiga Tech, a digital ecosystem based on artificial intelligence data and digital processes that offers technological solutions for sports and entertainment.

Audiovisual production 

The biggest games in each round of fixtures are recorded using a 4k High Dynamic Range (HDR) system with 20 HDR cameras, whilst for special fixtures (El Clasico or finals) 30 cameras are employed. Since the 2017/18 season, all of the LaLiga stadiums have been equipped with a tactical camera that automatically follows the play and produces a live tactical overview that is made available to the teams' analysts. In addition, the stadiums also boast an aerial camera that is positioned 21 metres above the pitch, and 38 ultra-high definition cameras are located around the stadiums to generate 360º volumetric video clips and provide replays of each move from every angle. In addition, Replay 360 technology is also used to generate virtual graphics during live broadcasts.

Technological tools 
Artificial intelligence, a plentiful supply of data and the use of specific tools serve to assist clubs when it comes to making decisions on certain issues.

Mediacoach offers the 42 top-flight and second-tier teams statistical and analytic data (supplied by GPS cameras that monitor each player) regarding the performance levels of every player. This allows for analysis of the play and the technical-tactical and fitness aspects involved in a game.

Players are provided with access to the Players APP, an exclusive application developed for LaLiga players in conjunction with the Club del Deportista magazine, which provides them with the data collected by Mediacoach and personalised information at the end of every game.

Calendar Selector is a LaLiga-developed tool used to optimise stadium attendance and TV audience figures. An algorithm uses tens of historical variables including kick-off times, TV audiences, stadium attendance figures, league standings, etc. to help to optimise decision-making when it comes to scheduling kick-off time.

Sunlight Broadcasting Planning: This tool involved the reconstruction of the LaLiga stadiums in detailed 3D images. The software allows for a date and kick-off time to be input into the system, which offers a completely accurate picture of the sunlight, light, shade, brightness, etc. and provides a prediction of how this will impact on the supporters and the TV image. This tool is also used to make improved decisions regarding kick-off times.

Applications & games 
As of October 2021, the LaLiga apps had registered over 116 million downloads, of which 80% were from beyond Spain's borders. LaLiga has developed the following apps: the official LaLiga App, Quiniela (football pools), club apps (available for 23 LaLiga clubs), LaLiga Fantasy MARCA, Head Football, Tiny Striker LaLiga, LaLiga Top Cards, LaLiga Educational Games and voice assistants (Google, Cortana, Skype, Samsung Bixby, Movistar Home).

In the 2017/18 season, LaLiga entered the virtual world of eSports. During the 2019/20 campaign, the eLaLiga Santander tournament was held as a part of the official EA Sports TM FIFA 20 Global Series in Spain competition, which involved the participation of 33 LaLiga Santander and LaLiga SmartBank teams.

Social media 
In February 2022, LaLiga surpassed 150 million followers across its social media channels (in the 2013/14 season its followers numbered just 3.9m).

The institution has 22 accounts across the following 12 platforms: Facebook, Twitter (LaLiga, LaLigaEN, LaLigaArab, LaLigaBRA, LaLigaFRA, LaLigaJP, LaLigaID, LaLigaTH, LaLigaSports, eSportsLaLiga, Fundación LaLiga), Instagram, YouTube, TikTok, four networks in China (Weibo, WeChat, Douyin, Toutiao); two social media channels in Russia (OK, VK); Line (three accounts: one for Japan, another for Thailand and one for Indonesia).

LaLiga boasts a global audience that spans across the world. The country with the highest number of followers is Spain (7m), followed by Indonesia (over 5.2m); India (more than 5.1m); Mexico (over 5m); Brazil (more than 4.7m) and China and Egypt (over 4m apiece).

When interacting with all of these users, LaLiga communicates in over 15 languages. In addition to addressing followers in Spanish, the institution also communicates its message in English, Arabic, Chinese, French, Japanese, Portuguese, Turkish, Russian, Hindi, Bengali, Indonesia, Thai, Filipino, Danish, Vietnamese, Pidgin English, Swahili, Wolof, Lingala, and Hebrew, amongst other languages.

Measures against violence, match-fixing & piracy 
One of the objectives actively pursued by LaLiga is to eradicate violence, xenophobia and racism, match-fixing and audiovisual piracy. LaLiga submits a weekly report to the RFEF and the Anti-violence Committee with information regarding chants heard during matches that incite violence or feature content that is insulting in nature. The aforementioned bodies are the only ones possessing the authority to impose sanctions. 

With regards to match-fixing, in addition to the use of technology, talks on integrity and security are given to all players involved in both leagues. The technology monitors all bookmakers throughout the world and detects any abnormal betting patterns, which are analysed by experts, and where any suspicion arises, the case is referred to the police and legal authorities. In the fight against match-fixing and the detection of cases through the use of technology, clubs have been equipped with tools such as Tyche 3.0.  There have been instances where complaints brought by LaLiga have resulted in legal proceedings, as was the case with Operacion Oikos. 

In relation to audiovisual piracy, as well as boasting a specific anti-piracy department that works alongside other European leagues, the institution advocates legal action, lobbies and works to establish institutional relations to favour the implementation of anti-piracy legislation (both in Spain and abroad). The digital tools employed by LaLiga in the pursuit of cases of piracy, including the Marauder software, have been shared with the Spanish Ministry of Culture, which has made significant strides in tackling fraud and intellectual property crime.

Support for sport & society

LaLiga Sports 
LaLigaSports was founded in 2016 in response to the commitments made under the Royal Decree-Law 5/2015 and as a means to support other Spanish sports apart from football and boost the sports industry in general. The organisation is made up of 64 federations and receives 1% of the revenue from the sale of football's audiovisual rights. One of the association's objectives is to cover the social security payments of elite athletes who compete in other sporting disciplines, as well as funding their participation in international competitions. The financial assistance, which amounts to 1% of the audiovisual rights, is administered by the CSD, which in the 2018/19 season paid out €13,350,000 across the following three areas: social security, grants and international competitions.

LaLigaSportsTV 
At the start of 2019, LaLiga launched the LaLigaSportsTV platform, an over-the-top service which offers live coverage of a variety of Spanish sports competitions, and that, in addition to football, provides viewers with the latest news of the other sports which receive less media coverage. The platform broadcasts the competitions via streaming, which means that they are available to all users, although some of the coverage is open access and other content requires the payment of a fee. In terms of the football coverage, users must make a prior payment to gain access to LaLiga SmartBank matches, whilst the rest of the sports are available at no cost (with exceptions). Top-flight football fixtures are not available via the platform, although match highlights and pre- and post-match interviews are offered. In short, the platform provides coverage of a great number of Spanish sports and competitions, but content which is typically paid for (basketball leagues, tennis tournaments, etc.) is not included. At the close of 2019, the platform boasted over 400,000 registered users and featured coverage of 30 sporting disciplines.

Women's football 
A LaLiga department to study and promote the female game and support the clubs in their decision-making in relation to the professionalization and visibility of female players and women's football fixtures was opened in 2015.This department was also a driving force behind the creation of the Spanish Association of Women's Football Clubs, which works to promote a broad range of activities that contribute to the development of ladies' football. When created in 2015, the association had 13 founder members, with this number having risen to 69 participating clubs in 2020.

Foundation 
The Professional Football League's Foundation is a private, cultural organisation, created following a unanimously approved initiative proposed by the National Professional Football League's general assembly. The institution, which is an independent legal entity and a non-profit-making organisation with full functional autonomy, was legally constituted on 5 February 1993.

The Foundation's main objective is the promotion, development, funding, investigation and organisation of cultural activities in general and, in particular, those relating to physical culture and football. 

In the pursuit of its objectives, the Foundation runs cultural activities through the awarding of scholarships and study grants for the purposes of sports training, learning and research, artistic competition and promotion, exhibitions, conferences, publications, youth football competitions and any other cultural and sporting events. 

Since 2017, the Foundation has organised LaLiga Genuine Santander, a football league for intellectually challenged footballers that features the participation of 36 LaLiga clubs.

LaLiga Business School 
The institution, created to contribute to the training of leaders in the football industry and across other global sports, opened its doors in 2018. Run in conjunction with the Universidad Francisco de Vitoria, the school offers postgraduate studies and a range of other training courses. The school runs the following master's programmes: Law Applied to Professional Football; Management, Methodology and Analysis in Football; and Global Sports Marketing, whilst also providing the following courses: LaLiga eSport, Digital Strategy & Data, and Behind the scenes at a sports event. All of these courses include both theoretical and practical elements and are imparted by seasoned industry professionals.

Stay at home: COVID-19 
During the course of the COVID-19 crisis, which brought the competition to a temporary standstill, LaLiga organised a series of activities as a part of the Quédate En Casa (Stay At Home) campaign as it created entertainment content that could be enjoyed at home.

The first of these initiatives was the LaLiga Santander Challenge, a FIFA 20 tournament contested by one representative from each of the LaLiga squads, with Real Madrid's Marco Asensio ultimately prevailing as victor. Followed by over a million users, the competition raised €180,000 towards the battle against COVID-19.

The institution also organised LaLiga Santander Fest, a music festival featuring a line-up of famous artists and footballers, who took part from their homes as they contributed to raising funds for the purchase of medical supplies.

Elsewhere, LaLiga's partners in China assisted during the health crisis by donating 170,000 facemasks. All of these initiatives saw LaLiga make the following donations to Spanish society: 1,435,000 high-risk facemasks, 115 non-invasive respirators, 12,595 disposable, sterile gowns and 500,000 sets of gloves.

International growth 
The rise in interest in the Spanish game has prompted the global expansion of the National Professional Football League, which has been grounded on three fundamental cornerstones: its international offices, the Global Network and the joint-venture partnerships that the institution has established across the world. The institution's international offices are located in: Belgium (Brussels), China (Shanghai and Beijing), South Africa (Johannesburg), the United States (New York), the United Arab Emirates (Dubai), India (New Delhi), Nigeria (Lagos), Mexico (Mexico City), Singapore (Singapore), the UK (London) and Spain (Madrid and Barcelona).

The LaLiga Global Network is formed by 44 delegates, who are based in locations throughout 41 countries. Featuring amongst the joint-venture partnerships signed by the institution are LaLiga North America, in conjunction with RELEVENT, that aims to introduce the Spanish game into the United States.

In 2020, LaLiga was named as the Honorary Ambassador of Brand Spain in the international relations category, "on account of its contribution to offering a positive image of Spain across the world through football" and "assisting the internationalisation of both Spanish companies and athletes."

See also
 Spanish football league system
 Royal Spanish Football Federation

Notes

References

External links

 

Football governing bodies in Spain
Sports leagues established in 1984